ROSTO or Rosto may refer to:

DOSAAF, a paramilitary sport organization in the Soviet Union
Rosto (1969–2019), Dutch artist and filmmaker